Travis Jarred Blackley (born 4 November 1982) is an Australian former professional baseball pitcher. He played in Major League Baseball (MLB) for the Seattle Mariners, San Francisco Giants, Oakland Athletics, Houston Astros, and Texas Rangers. Blackley also played in the KBO League for the Kia Tigers, in Nippon Professional Baseball (NPB) for the Tohoku Rakuten Golden Eagles, in the Mexican Baseball League (LMB) for the Pericos de Puebla, in Liga Mexicana del Pacifico on the Aguilas de Mexicali and the Naranjeros de Hermosillo and the Brisbane Bandits & Melbourne Aces of the Australian Baseball League (ABL).
Travis currently plays club ball for the Twin City Baseball Club in the Gold Coast Baseball Association Division 1 winter league.

Professional career

Seattle Mariners
Blackley was signed by the Seattle Mariners as an undrafted free agent on 29 October 2000. He had a 6–1 record with a 3.32 ERA in 14 starts. He also had 90 strikeouts in 78⅔ innings and held opponents to a .211 batting average.

He had 152 strikeouts in 121.1 innings, second among all Mariner minor leaguers.

He led the Texas League with 17 wins; was second in ERA (2.61), fourth in strikeouts (144) and fourth in innings pitched (162.1).

He pitched in the Texas League postseason All-Star game and was named to the World squad in the 2003 All-Star Futures Game at U.S. Cellular Field on 15 July. The Mariners also named him their minor league pitcher of the year.

In , Baseball America designated him as #63 out of the top 100 minor league prospects, the third best prospect in the Mariners' system behind pitchers Félix Hernández and Clint Nageotte and their top left-handed prospect. He began the season with the Triple-A Tacoma Rainiers. The Mariners, after trading Freddy García to the Chicago White Sox, needed another starter and purchased Blackley's contract on 1 July 2004. He made his major league debut on that same day against the Texas Rangers and beat them, allowing 4 runs on 6 hits in 5⅔ innings. He became just the sixth Mariner pitcher in the team's history to start and win his major league debut.

After spending a month with the major league club going only 1–3 with a 10.04 ERA in 6 starts, Blackley was optioned back to Triple-A Tacoma on 1 August 2004. He had an 8–6 record with a 3.83 ERA in 19 games (18 starts) with Tacoma in 2004 before ending the season on the disabled list with left shoulder tendinitis.  He missed the entire  season recovering from left shoulder surgery.

In March , Blackley was slated to play in the World Baseball Classic with team Australia but was scratched to continue rehabbing his shoulder.

He spent most of 2006 with Double-A San Antonio. After going 8–11 and 4.06 in 25 starts in Double-A, he was promoted back to Triple-A Tacoma at the end of August where he made 2 starts going 1–1 and 4.09.

San Francisco Giants
On 1 April 2007, after spring training, he was traded to the San Francisco Giants for outfielder Jason Ellison and was immediately optioned to Triple-A Fresno, pitching the entire season in the minor leagues with the Grizzlies. He went 10–8 with a 4.66 ERA in 28 starts. He was recalled on 21 September, and on 23 September made his first major league start since 31 July 2004 against the Cincinnati Reds. He won his Giant debut, giving up two runs in the first inning and three hits in five innings, walking four and striking out five.

Philadelphia Phillies
After being outrighted off the San Francisco roster on 6 December 2007, Blackley was selected by the Philadelphia Phillies in the major league portion of the Rule 5 draft.

Philadelphia put him on waivers towards the end of  spring training. The Giants did not reclaim him, and the Phillies outrighted him to Triple-A Lehigh Valley. He became a free agent at the end of the season.

Arizona Diamondbacks

On 19 December , he signed a major league contract with the Arizona Diamondbacks. On 1 April 2009, the D'backs outrighted him to Triple-A Reno.

New York Mets
Blackley began the 2010 season with the New York Mets' AAA affiliate Buffalo Bisons, but the Mets released him on 2 May.

Oakland Athletics
On 13 May 2010, he signed with the Oakland Athletics who assigned him to their Triple-A affiliate, the Sacramento River Cats.

Kia Tigers
He ended up with the Kia Tigers in the KBO League in 2011. In 25 appearances, he had a record of 7 wins and 5 losses with an ERA of 3.48.

San Francisco Giants (second stint)
On 16 February 2012, he signed a minor-league contract with the San Francisco Giants with an invitation to spring training.
On 1 May, the Giants purchased his contract and called him up from Triple-A Fresno.  He pitched 4 games in relief for the Giants before being designated for assignment on 13 May.

Oakland Athletics (second stint)

Two days later, on 15 May 2012, the Oakland Athletics claimed him off waivers and signed him.  He made his first appearance for the A's on 18 May in relief against the Giants.  On 28 May, he started his first game for the team, against the Twins, and was added to the starting rotation. He finished with a 6–4 record and a 3.86 ERA for the season with the A's.

Houston Astros
On 4 April 2013, the Oakland Athletics traded Blackley to the Houston Astros for outfielder Jake Goebbert. He was designated for assignment on 9 August 2013.

Texas Rangers
On 14 August 2013, the Houston Astros traded Blackley to the Texas Rangers for a player to be named later.  Ironically, Blackley's first appearance with the Rangers was against the Astros on 20 August 2013.  Blackley started and pitched 4 innings, allowing 2 runs, as the Rangers won 4–2.

Tohoku Rakuten Golden Eagles
Blackley signed with the Tohoku Rakuten Golden Eagles in December 2013.

San Francisco Giants (third stint)
On 12 January 2015, Blackley signed a minor league contract with the San Francisco Giants.

Miami Marlins
On 25 April 2015, Blackley announced that he had signed a minor league deal with the Miami Marlins.

Pericos de Puebla
On 19 April 2016, Blackley signed with the Pericos de Puebla of the Mexican League.

Detroit Tigers
On 20 December 2016, Blackely signed a minor league contract with the Detroit Tigers. He was released on 1 April 2017.

Return to Puebla
On 10 April 2017, Blackley signed with the Pericos de Puebla of the Mexican Baseball League. After a rough start to the season, he was released on 7 May 2017.

Pittsburg Diamonds
On 6 July 2017, Blackley signed with the Pittsburg Diamonds of the Pacific Association. He re-signed with the team for the 2018 season.

Australian Baseball League

Melbourne Aces
Travis made the 35-man roster of the Melbourne Aces for the inaugural Australian Baseball League season in 2010.  On 2 December 2010, he was activated onto the 22-man roster and made his debut for the Aces on 5 December starting against the Sydney Blue Sox and pitching a rain-shortened one-hit shutout. He had previously played for the Victoria Aces in the Australian semiprofessional Claxton Shield.

Brisbane Bandits
Blackley signed with the Brisbane Bandits of the Australian Baseball League for the 2015 season where he helped the Bandits to their first Claxton Shield victory since the re-establishment of the ABL in 2010. He resigned for the 2018 season.

Retirement
On February 6, 2021, Blackley announced his retirement from professional baseball via Twitter.

International career
Blackley was selected for the Australian national baseball team at the 2007 Baseball World Cup, 2009 World Baseball Classic, 2017 World Baseball Classic, and 2018 exhibition games against Japan.

Blackley was first selected for Australia in the 2006 World Baseball Classic, but did not play due to an ongoing shoulder injury (as cited above). He debuted for Australia in the 2007 Baseball World Cup and went 0–1 and 1.64 ERA for the tournament, his only loss coming against the Japan when Tadashi Settsu threw a shutout against Australia in the quarter-final, with Australia finishing 5th. He again pitched for Australia in the 2009 World Baseball Classic, earning a no-decision against Cuba and a 1.59 ERA for the tournament.

On 20 February 2018, he was selected exhibition games against Japan.

Personal life
Blackley has a son, Tristan (born 6 January 2005) from a previous marriage.
Travis married Jenna Blackley on 14 November 2015. They have a son, Bodhi (born 29 November 2016.)
His younger brother, Adam Blackley, formerly played in the Boston Red Sox farm system as well as for the Melbourne Aces in the ABL and the L&D Amsterdam in the Dutch league Honkbal Hoofdklasse. He is an avid supporter of Essendon Football Club.

References

External links

Career statistics and player information from KBO League

1982 births
Living people
Águilas de Mexicali players
Australian expatriate baseball players in Japan
Australian expatriate baseball players in Mexico
Australian expatriate baseball players in South Korea
Australian expatriate baseball players in the United States
Brisbane Bandits players
Buffalo Bisons (minor league) players
Dorados de Chihuahua players
Everett AquaSox players
Fresno Grizzlies players
Houston Astros players
KBO League pitchers
Kia Tigers players
Lehigh Valley IronPigs players
Major League Baseball pitchers
Major League Baseball players from Australia
Melbourne Aces players
Mexican League baseball pitchers
Naranjeros de Hermosillo players
New Orleans Zephyrs players
Nippon Professional Baseball pitchers
Oakland Athletics players
Oklahoma City RedHawks players
Pericos de Puebla players
Pittsburg Diamonds players
Reno Aces players
Round Rock Express players
Sacramento River Cats players
San Antonio Missions players
San Bernardino Stampede players
San Francisco Giants players
Seattle Mariners players
Sportspeople from Melbourne
Stockton Ports players
Tacoma Rainiers players
Texas Rangers players
Tohoku Rakuten Golden Eagles players
2009 World Baseball Classic players
2017 World Baseball Classic players